Mohammad Abu Khousa is a Jordanian former footballer.

References

External links 
 
 

1987 births
Living people
Jordanian footballers
Jordan international footballers
Jordanian people of Palestinian descent
Jordanian Pro League players
Association football goalkeepers
Footballers at the 2010 Asian Games
Al-Baqa'a Club players
That Ras Club players
Al-Hussein SC (Irbid) players
Al-Faisaly SC players
Al-Asalah players
Asian Games competitors for Jordan